Combat stress reaction (CSR) is acute behavioral disorganization as a direct result of the trauma of war. Also known as "combat fatigue", "battle fatigue", or "battle neurosis", it has some overlap with the diagnosis of acute stress reaction used in civilian psychiatry. It is historically linked to shell shock and can sometimes precurse post-traumatic stress disorder.

Combat stress reaction is an acute reaction that includes a range of behaviors resulting from the stress of battle that decrease the combatant's fighting efficiency. The most common symptoms are fatigue, slower reaction times, indecision, disconnection from one's surroundings, and the inability to prioritize. Combat stress reaction is generally short-term and should not be confused with acute stress disorder, post-traumatic stress disorder, or other long-term disorders attributable to combat stress, although any of these may commence as a combat stress reaction. The US Army uses the term/acronym COSR (Combat Stress Reaction) in official medical reports. This term can be applied to any stress reaction in the military unit environment. Many reactions look like symptoms of mental illness (such as panic, extreme anxiety, depression, and hallucinations), but they are only transient reactions to the traumatic stress of combat and the cumulative stresses of military operations.

In World War I, shell shock was considered a psychiatric illness resulting from injury to the nerves during combat. The nature of trench warfare meant that about 10% of the fighting soldiers were killed (compared to 4.5% during World War II) and the total proportion of troops who became casualties (killed or wounded) was about 57%. Whether a person with shell-shock was considered "wounded" or "sick" depended on the circumstances.  When faced with the phenomenon of a minority of soldiers mentally breaking down, there was an expectation that the root of this problem lay in character of the individual soldier, not because of what they experienced on the front lines during the war.  The large proportion of World War I veterans in the European population meant that the symptoms were common to the culture.

Signs and symptoms
Combat stress reaction symptoms align with the symptoms also found in psychological trauma, which is closely related to post-traumatic stress disorder (PTSD). CSR differs from PTSD (among other things) in that a PTSD diagnosis requires a duration of symptoms over one month, which CSR does not.

Fatigue-related symptoms
The most common stress reactions include:

The slowing of reaction time
Slowness of thought
Difficulty prioritizing tasks
Difficulty initiating routine tasks
Preoccupation with minor issues and familiar tasks
Indecision and lack of concentration
Loss of initiative with fatigue
Exhaustion

Autonomic nervous system – Autonomic arousal

Headaches
Back pains
Inability to relax
Shaking and tremors
Sweating
Nausea and vomiting
Loss of appetite
Abdominal distress
Frequency of urination
Urinary incontinence
Heart palpitations
Hyperventilation
Dizziness
Insomnia
Nightmares
Restless sleep
Excessive sleep
Excessive startle
Hypervigilance
Heightened sense of threat
Anxiety
Irritability
Depression
Substance abuse
Loss of adaptability
Attempted suicides
Disruptive behavior
Mistrust of others
Confusion
Extreme feeling of losing control

Battle casualty rates
The ratio of stress casualties to battle casualties varies with the intensity of the fighting. With intense fighting, it can be as high as 1:1. In low-level conflicts, it can drop to 1:10 (or less).
Modern warfare embodies the principles of continuous operations with an expectation of higher combat stress casualties.

The World War II European Army rate of stress casualties of 1 in 10 (101:1,000) troops per annum is skewed downward from both its norm and peak by data by low rates during the last years of the war.

Diagnosis
The following PIE principles were in place for the "not yet diagnosed nervous" (NYDN) cases:
 Proximity – treat the casualties close to the front and within sound of the fighting.
 Immediacy – treat them without delay and not wait until the wounded were all dealt with.
 Expectancy – ensure that everyone had the expectation of their return to the front after a rest and replenishment.

United States medical officer Thomas W. Salmon is often quoted as the originator of these PIE principles. However, his real strength came from going to Europe and learning from the Allies and then instituting the lessons. By the end of the war, Salmon had set up a complete system of units and procedures that was then the "world's best practice". After the war, he maintained his efforts in educating society and the military. He was awarded the Distinguished Service Medal for his contributions.

Effectiveness of the PIE approach has not been confirmed by studies of CSR, and there is some evidence that it is not effective in preventing PTSD.

US services now use the more recently developed BICEPS principles:
 Brevity
 Immediacy
 Centrality or contact
 Expectancy
 Proximity
 Simplicity

Between the wars
The British government produced a Report of the War Office Committee of Inquiry into "Shell-Shock", which was published in 1922. Recommendations from this included:

Part of the concern was that many British veterans were receiving pensions and had long-term disabilities.

By 1939, some 120,000 British ex-servicemen had received final awards for primary psychiatric disability or were still drawing pensions – about 15% of all pensioned disabilities – and another 44,000 or so were getting pensions for 'soldier's heart' or Effort Syndrome.  There is, though, much that statistics do not show, because in terms of psychiatric effects, pensioners were just the tip of a huge iceberg."

War correspondent Philip Gibbs wrote:

One British writer between the wars wrote:

World War II

American
At the outbreak of World War II, most in the United States military had forgotten the treatment lessons of World War I. Screening of applicants was initially rigorous, but experience eventually showed it to lack great predictive power.

The US entered the war in December 1941. Only in November 1943 was a psychiatrist added to the table of organization of each division, and this policy was not implemented in the Mediterranean Theater of Operations until March 1944. By 1943, the US Army was using the term "exhaustion" as the initial diagnosis of psychiatric cases, and the general principles of military psychiatry were being used. General Patton's slapping incident was in part the spur to institute forward treatment for the Italian invasion of September 1943. The importance of unit cohesion and membership of a group as a protective factor emerged.

John Appel found that the average American infantryman in Italy was "worn out" in 200 to 240 days and concluded that the American soldier "fights for his buddies or because his self respect won't let him quit". After several months in combat, the soldier lacked reasons to continue to fight because he had proven his bravery in battle and was no longer with most of the fellow soldiers he trained with. Appel helped implement a 180-day limit for soldiers in active combat and suggested that the war be made more meaningful, emphasizing their enemies' plans to conquer the United States, encouraging soldiers to fight to prevent what they had seen happen in other countries happen to their families. Other psychiatrists believed that letters from home discouraged soldiers by increasing nostalgia and needlessly mentioning problems soldiers could not solve. William Menninger said after the war, "It might have been wise to have had a nation-wide educational course in letter writing to soldiers", and Edward Strecker criticized "moms" (as opposed to mothers) who, after failing to "wean" their sons, damaged morale through letters.

Airmen flew far more often in the Southwest Pacific than in Europe, and although rest time in Australia was scheduled, there was no fixed number of missions that would produce transfer out of combat, as was the case in Europe. Coupled with the monotonous, hot, sickly environment, the result was bad morale that jaded veterans quickly passed along to newcomers. After a few months, epidemics of combat fatigue would drastically reduce the efficiency of units. Flight surgeons reported that the men who had been at jungle airfields longest were in bad shape:
Many have chronic dysentery or other disease, and almost all show chronic fatigue states. … They appear listless, unkempt, careless, and apathetic with almost mask-like facial expression. Speech is slow, thought content is poor, they complain of chronic headaches, insomnia, memory defect, feel forgotten, worry about themselves, are afraid of new assignments, have no sense of responsibility, and are hopeless about the future.

British
Unlike the Americans, the British leaders firmly held the lessons of World War I. It was estimated that aerial bombardment would kill up to 35,000 a day, but the Blitz killed only 40,000 in total. The expected torrent of civilian mental breakdown did not occur. The Government turned to World War I doctors for advice on those who did have problems. The PIE principles were generally used. However, in the British Army, since most of the World War I doctors were too old for the job, young, analytically trained psychiatrists were employed. Army doctors "appeared to have no conception of breakdown in war and its treatment, though many of them had served in the 1914–1918 war." The first Middle East Force psychiatric hospital was set up in 1942. With D-Day for the first month there was a policy of holding casualties for only 48 hours before they were sent back over the Channel. This went firmly against the expectancy principle of PIE.

Appel believed that British soldiers were able to continue to fight almost twice as long as their American counterparts because the British had better rotation schedules and because they, unlike the Americans, "fight for survival" – for the British soldiers, the threat from the Axis powers was much more real, given Britain's proximity to mainland Europe, and the fact that Germany was concurrently conducting air raids and bombarding British industrial cities. Like the Americans, British doctors believed that letters from home often needlessly damaged soldiers' morale.

Canadian
The Canadian Army recognized combat stress reaction as "Battle Exhaustion" during the Second World War and classified it as a separate type of combat wound. Historian Terry Copp has written extensively on the subject. In Normandy, "The infantry units engaged in the battle also experienced a rapid rise in the number of battle exhaustion cases with several hundred men evacuated due to the stress of combat. Regimental Medical Officers were learning that neither elaborate selection methods nor extensive training could prevent a considerable number of combat soldiers from breaking down."

Germans
In his history of the pre-Nazi Freikorps paramilitary organizations, Vanguard of Nazism, historian Robert G. L. Waite describes some of the emotional effects of World War I on German troops, and refers to a phrase he attributes to Göring: men who could not become "de-brutalized".

In an interview, Dr Rudolf Brickenstein stated that:

However, as World War II progressed there was a profound rise in stress casualties from 1% of hospitalizations in 1935 to 6% in 1942. Another German psychiatrist reported after the war that during the last two years, about a third of all hospitalizations at Ensen were due to war neurosis. It is probable that there was both less of a true problem and less perception of a problem.

Finns
The Finnish attitudes to "war neurosis" were especially tough. Psychiatrist Harry Federley, who was the head of the Military Medicine, considered shell shock as a sign of weak character and lack of moral fibre. His treatment for war neurosis was simple: the patients were to be bullied and harassed until they returned to front line service.

Earlier, during the Winter War, several Finnish machine gun operators on the Karelian Isthmus theatre became mentally unstable after repelling several unsuccessful Soviet human wave assaults on fortified Finnish positions.

Post-World War II developments
Simplicity was added to the PIE principles by the Israelis: in their view, treatment should be brief, supportive, and could be provided by those without sophisticated training.

Peacekeeping stresses
Peacekeeping provides its own stresses because its emphasis on rules of engagement contains the roles for which soldiers are trained. Causes include witnessing or experiencing the following:
 Constant tension and threat of conflict.
 Threat of land mines and booby traps.
 Close contact with severely injured and dead people.
 Deliberate maltreatment and atrocities, possibly involving civilians.
 Cultural issues.
 Separation and home issues.
 Risk of disease including HIV.
 Threat of exposure to toxic agents.
 Mission problems.
 Return to service.

Pathophysiology

SNS activation

Many of the symptoms initially experienced by people with CSR are effects of an extended activation of the human body's fight-or-flight response. The fight-or-flight response involves a general sympathetic nervous system discharge in reaction to a perceived stressor and prepares the body to fight or run from the threat causing the stress. Catecholamine hormones, such as adrenaline or noradrenaline, facilitate immediate physical reactions associated with a preparation for violent muscular action. Although the flight-or-fight-response normally ends with the removal of the threat, the constant mortal danger in combat zones likewise constantly and acutely stresses soldiers.

General adaptation syndrome

The process whereby the human body responds to extended stress is known as general adaptation syndrome (GAS). After the initial fight-or-flight response, the body becomes more resistant to stress in an attempt to dampen the sympathetic nervous response and return to homeostasis. During this period of resistance, physical and mental symptoms of CSR may be drastically reduced as the body attempts to cope with the stress. Long combat involvement, however, may keep the body from homeostasis and thereby deplete its resources and render it unable to normally function, sending it into the third stage of GAS: exhaustion. Sympathetic nervous activation remains in the exhaustion phase and reactions to stress are markedly sensitized as fight-or-flight symptoms return. If the body remains in a state of stress, then such more severe symptoms of CSR as cardiovascular and digestive involvement may present themselves. Extended exhaustion can permanently damage the body.

Treatment

7 Rs 
The British Army treated Operational Stress Reaction according to the 7 R's:
Recognition – identify that the individual has an Operational Stress Reaction
Respite – provide a short period of relief from the front line
Rest – allow rest and recovery
Recall – give the individual the chance to recall and discuss the experiences that have led to the reaction
Reassurance – inform them that their reaction is normal and they will recover
Rehabilitation – improve the physical and mental health of the patient until they no longer show symptoms
Return – allow the soldier to return to their unit

BICEPS
Modern front-line combat stress treatment techniques are designed to mimic the historically used PIE techniques with some modification. BICEPS is the current treatment route employed by the U.S. military and stresses differential treatment by the severity of CSR symptoms present in the service member. BICEPS is employed as a means to treat CSR symptoms and return soldiers quickly to combat.

The following subsections on the BICEPS program are adapted from the USMC combat stress handbook:

Brevity

Critical Event Debriefing should take 2 to 3 hours. Initial rest and replenishment at medical CSC (Combat Stress Control) facilities should last no more than 3 or 4 days. Those requiring further treatment are moved to the next level of care. Since many require no further treatment, military commanders expect their service members to return to duty rapidly.

Immediacy

CSC should be done as soon as possible when operations permit. Intervention is provided as soon as symptoms appear.

Centrality/Contact

Service members requiring observation or care beyond the unit level are evacuated to facilities in close proximity to, but separate from the medical or surgical patients at the BAS, surgical support company in a central location (Marines) or forward support/division support or area support medical companies (Army) nearest the service members' unit. It is best to send service members who cannot continue their mission and require more extensive respite to a central facility other than a hospital, unless no other alternative is possible. The service member must be encouraged to continue to think of themselves as a war fighter, rather than a patient or a sick person. The chain of command remains directly involved in the service member's recovery and return to duty. The CSC team coordinates with the unit's leaders to learn whether the over-stressed individual was a good performer prior to the combat stress reaction, or whether they were always a marginal or problem performer whom the team would rather see replaced than returned. Whenever possible, representatives of the unit, or messages from the unit, tell the casualty that they are needed and wanted back. The CSC team coordinates with the unit leaders, through unit medical personnel or chaplains, any special advice on how to assure quick reintegration when the service member returns to their unit.

Expectancy

The individual is explicitly told that he is reacting normally to extreme stress and is expected to recover and return to full duty in a few hours or days. A military leader is extremely effective in this area of treatment. Of all the things said to a service member experiencing combat stress, the words of his small-unit leader have the greatest impact due to the positive bonding process that occurs during combat. Simple statements from the small-unit leader to the service member that he is reacting normally to combat stress and is expected back soon have positive impact. Small-unit leaders should tell service members that their comrades need and expect them to return. When they do return, the unit treats them as every other service member and expects them to perform well. Service members experiencing and recovering from combat stress disorder are no more likely to become overloaded again than are those who have not yet been overloaded. In fact, they are less likely to become overloaded than inexperienced replacements.

Proximity

In mobile war requiring rapid and frequent movement, treatment of many combat stress cases takes place at various battalion or regimental headquarters or logistical
units, on light duty, rather than in medical units, whenever possible. This is a key factor and another area where the small-unit leader helps in the treatment. CSC and follow-up care for combat stress casualties are held as close as possible to and maintain close association with the member's unit, and are an integral part of the entire healing process. A visit from a member of the individual's unit during restoration is effective in keeping a bond with the organization. A service member experiencing combat stress reaction is having a crisis, and there are two basic elements to that crisis working in opposite directions. On the one hand, the service member is driven by a strong desire to seek safety and to get out of an intolerable environment. On the other hand, the service member does not want to let their comrades down. They want to return to their unit. If a service member starts to lose contact with their unit when he enters treatment, the impulse to get out of the war and return to safety takes over. They feel that they've failed their comrades who have already rejected them as unworthy. The potential is for the service member to become more and more emotionally invested in keeping their symptoms so they can stay in a safe environment. Much of this is done outside the service member's conscious awareness, but the result is the same. The more out of touch the service member is with their unit, the less likely they will recover. They are more likely to develop a chronic psychiatric illness and get evacuated from the war.

Simplicity

Treatment is kept simple. CSC is not therapy. Psychotherapy is not done. The goal is to rapidly restore the service member's coping skills so that he functions and returns to duty again. Sleep, food, water, hygiene, encouragement, work details, and confidence-restoring talk are often all that is needed to restore a service member to full operational readiness. This can be done in units in reserve positions, logistical units or at medical companies. Every effort is made to reinforce service members' identity. They are required to wear their uniforms and to keep their helmets, equipment, chemical protective gear, and flak jackets with them. When possible, they are allowed to keep their weapons after the weapons have been cleared. They may serve on guard duty or as members of a standby quick reaction force.

Predeployment preparation

Screening
Historically, screening programs that have attempted to preclude soldiers exhibiting personality traits thought to predispose them to CSR have been a total failure. Part of this failure stems from the inability to base CSR morbidity on one or two personality traits. Full psychological work-ups are expensive and inconclusive, while pen and paper tests are ineffective and easily faked. In addition, studies conducted following WWII screening programs showed that psychological disorders present during military training did not accurately predict stress disorders during combat.

Cohesion
While it is difficult to measure the effectiveness of such a subjective term, soldiers who reported in a WWII study that they had a "higher than average" sense of camaraderie and pride in their unit were more likely to report themselves ready for combat and less likely to develop CSR or other stress disorders. Soldiers with a "lower than average" sense of cohesion with their unit were more susceptible to stress illness.

Training
Stress exposure training or SET is a common component of most modern military training. There are three steps to an effective stress exposure program.

Providing knowledge of the stress environment

Soldiers with a knowledge of both the emotional and physical signs and symptoms of CSR are much less likely to have a critical event that reduces them below fighting capability. Instrumental information, such as breathing exercises that can reduce stress and suggestions not to look at the faces of enemy dead, is also effective at reducing the chance of a breakdown.

Skills acquisition

Cognitive control strategies can be taught to soldiers to help them recognize stressful and situationally detrimental thoughts and repress those thoughts in combat situations. Such skills have been shown to reduce anxiety and improve task performance.

Confidence building through application and practice

Soldiers who feel confident in their own abilities and those of their squad are far less likely to develop combat stress reaction. Training in stressful conditions that mimic those of an actual combat situation builds confidence in the abilities of themselves and the squad. As this training can actually induce some of the stress symptoms it seeks to prevent, stress levels should be increased incrementally as to allow the soldiers time to adapt.

Prognosis
Figures from the 1982 Lebanon war showed that with proximal treatment, 90% of CSR casualties returned to their unit, usually within 72 hours. With rearward treatment, only 40% returned to their unit. It was also found that treatment efficacy went up with the application of a variety of front line treatment principles versus just one treatment. In Korea, similar statistics were seen, with 85% of US battle fatigue casualties returned to duty within three days and 10% returned to limited duties after several weeks.

Though these numbers seem to promote the claims that proximal PIE or BICEPS treatment is generally effective at reducing the effects of combat stress reaction, other data suggests that long term PTSD effects may result from the hasty return of affected individuals to combat. Both PIE and BICEPS are meant to return as many soldiers as possible to combat, and may actually have adverse effects on the long-term health of service members who are rapidly returned to the front-line after combat stress control treatment. Although the PIE principles were used extensively in the Vietnam War, the post traumatic stress disorder lifetime rate for Vietnam veterans was 30% in a 1989 US study and 21% in a 1996 Australian study. In a study of Israeli Veterans of the 1973 Yom Kippur War, 37% of veterans diagnosed with CSR during combat were later diagnosed with PTSD, compared with 14% of control veterans.

Controversy
There is significant controversy with the PIE and BICEPS principles. Throughout a number of wars, but notably during the Vietnam War, there has been a conflict among doctors about sending distressed soldiers back to combat. During the Vietnam War this reached a peak with much discussion about the ethics of this process. Proponents of the PIE and BICEPS principles argue that it leads to a reduction of long-term disability but opponents argue that combat stress reactions lead to long-term problems such as post-traumatic stress disorder.

The use of psychiatric drugs to treat people with CSR has also attracted criticism, as some military psychiatrists have come to question the efficacy of such drugs on the long-term health of veterans. Concerns have been expressed as to the effect of pharmaceutical treatment on an already elevated substance abuse rate among former people with CSR.

Recent research has caused an increasing number of scientists to believe that there may be a physical (i.e., neurocerebral damage) rather than psychological basis for blast trauma. As traumatic brain injury and combat stress reaction have very different causes yet result in similar neurologic symptoms, researchers emphasize the need for greater diagnostic care.

See also
 Acute stress disorder
 Eye movement desensitization and reprocessing (modern treatment)
 Lack of Moral Fibre
 Shell shock
 Social alienation – among returning war veterans

References

Further reading
 
 
 
 
 
 
A Review on the Disarm Doctumentary
 Corns, Cathryn and Hughes-Wilson, John (2001) Blindfold and Alone – British Military Executions in the Great War (Cassell) 
 Lamprecht, Friedhelm and Sack, Martin, "Posttraumatic Stress Disorder Revisited"
 Dispatches: Lessons learned for Soldiers; Stress Injury and Operational Deployments, The Army Lessons Learned Centre, Canadian Forces Base Kingston, Vol. 10, No. 1, February 2004.
 Tyquin, M. Madness and the Military: Australia's Experience in the Great War. AMHP, Sydney, 2006.

External links 

Glossary of Traumatology
DCoE National Center for Telehealth and Technology
Mortar attacks becoming routine for troops in Afghanistan
A Matter of Duty: The Continuing War Against PTSD Documentary produced by the Maine Public Broadcasting Network

Aftermath of war
Military psychiatry
Psychological stress
Military medicine
Anxiety disorders